The 43rd National Assembly of Quebec consists of those elected in the October 3, 2022, general election. As a result, François Legault (Coalition Avenir Québec) was re-elected as Premier.

Member list

Cabinet ministers are in bold, party leaders are in italic and the president of the National Assembly is marked with a †.

* Marie-Claude Nichols was elected as a Liberal candidate in Vaudreuil. She was expelled from the Liberal caucus on October 27 after refusing the transport critic role.

Standings changes since the 43rd general election

Notes and references

Terms of the Quebec Legislature
2022 in Quebec
2022 in Canadian politics